Titus as a Monk or Rembrandt's Son Titus in a Monk's Habit is a 1660 oil-on-canvas painting by the Dutch artist Rembrandt, showing his son Titus in the habit of a Franciscan monk. It is now in the collection of the Rijksmuseum in Amsterdam.

References 

1660 paintings
Paintings in the collection of the Rijksmuseum
Paintings by Rembrandt
Religious paintings